Christine Pierre (born 1959) is a Belgian Scrabble player who has won the French World Scrabble Championships five times, equalling the record of Michel Duguet who won the competition five times in the 1980s while Pierre won all five of his titles in the 1990s. When the international Scrabble ratings were updated in July 2007, Pierre was ranked 2nd out of around 21,000 rated players, and the highest ranked Belgian player. Pierre is the current Belgian national champion in French (there's also a championship in Dutch) and has won the national championship 14 times in 22 years. Since 1973 the Belgian national championship has taken place 36 times, Pierre has won about 39% of all the championships.

Notable achievements
Five times World Champion: 1991, 1992, 1994, 1996, 1998
World Champion by pairs (with Jean-Piere Hellebaut): 1991
Belgian national champion 15 times: 1987, 1988, 1990, 1991, 1992, 1993, 1994, 1996, 2000, 2001, 2002, 2004, 2007, 2008, 2009

See also
Duplicate Scrabble
Francophone Scrabble

Sources

External links
Results list

Belgian Scrabble players
1959 births
Living people